Philip Dominic Seghi (March 9, 1909 – January 8, 1987) was an American front-office executive in Major League Baseball. A longtime associate of Gabe Paul, Seghi was credited with signing Pete Rose, the all-time leader in hits, when Seghi was farm system and scouting director of the Cincinnati Reds in 1960. 

He was born in Cedar Point, Illinois, to an Italian immigrant family, attended Northwestern University, and was an infielder in minor league baseball during his playing career.

After World War II, Seghi was a manager in the lower minor leagues in 1946–55, working in the Pittsburgh Pirates and Cleveland Indians organizations. After joining the Redlegs (as the Reds were known from 1953–58) as a scout, Seghi succeeded Bill McKechnie Jr. as Cincinnati's farm director after the  season. Serving under Paul and his successor, Bill DeWitt, Seghi remained with the Reds until 1968, a period during which the Reds built a player development organization that provided the foundation for the "Big Red Machine" dynasty.

In 1963, Seghi was promoted by DeWitt to assistant general manager, but a change in ownership and the arrival of Bob Howsam in 1967 as GM caused Seghi to leave Cincinnati for the Oakland Athletics at the close of that season. Led by flamboyant owner Charlie Finley and awash with young talent, the A's also were on the verge of a dynasty, winning five consecutive American League West Division titles (1971–75) and three consecutive AL pennants and World Series titles (1972–74). From 1968–71 Seghi served as Oakland's farm and scouting director and assistant to Finley, who was his own general manager.

By 1972, however, Seghi was back working with Paul as assistant general manager of the Cleveland Indians, and succeeded Paul as the Indians' GM in 1973. His most notable achievement occurred after the 1974 season, when he and owner Nick Mileti appointed Frank Robinson (signed and developed by the Cincinnati farm system of the 1950s) as Major League Baseball's first African-American manager. Seghi would serve 13 full seasons as Cleveland's general manager, but the Indians enjoyed only three above-.500 seasons during that time (and ).

Seghi stepped down after the 1985 campaign to become a senior player personnel adviser with Cleveland. He died of cancer in Thousand Oaks, California, on January 8, 1987, at the age of 77.

External links

References

Obituary, The New York Times, January 9, 1987.

1909 births
1987 deaths
Albany Senators players
American people of Italian descent
Baltimore Orioles (IL) players
Birmingham Barons players
Cedar Rapids Bunnies players
Cedar Rapids Raiders players
Cincinnati Reds executives
Cincinnati Reds scouts
Cleveland Indians executives
Dallas Rebels players
Deaths from cancer in California
Fargo-Moorhead Twins players
Hornell Maples players
Keokuk Pirates players
Major League Baseball executives
Major League Baseball farm directors
Major League Baseball general managers
Northwestern University alumni
Northwestern Wildcats baseball players
Northwestern Wildcats men's basketball players
Oakland Athletics executives
Pensacola Pilots players
People from Cedar Point, Illinois
Peoria Tractors players
Portsmouth Cubs players
Sioux City Cowboys players
Tallahassee Pirates players
Wilkes-Barre Barons players
Williamsport Grays players
Winnipeg Maroons (baseball) players